is a Japanese actor, TV personality, voice actor, screenwriter, theatre director, and singer. He was born in Teine-ku, Sapporo, Hokkaido. He is a member of the TEAM NACS. He graduated from Hokkaido Sapporo Teine High School and, Hokkai Gakuen University. His wife is actress Yui Ichikawa.

Biography 
Born and raised in the current Teine-ku, Sapporo. When he was a collage ronin (a student who failed to enter the university and is studying to pass the entrance exam again), he was fascinated by a solo performance by Issey Ogatabroadcast on TV, and decided to stop taking the entrance exam and become an actor. He declared this intention to his parents on the same day, but his parents strongly persuaded him in tears, so he ended up attending the college.  Entered a theater study group in Hokkai Gakuen University and started stage activities.

At the theater study group, he met Hiroyuki Morisaki, Ken Yasuda, Yo Oizumi, and Takuma Oto'o, and formed TEAM NACS as a one-time unit in 1996. He was thinking to go to Tokyo to continue acting, but TEAM NACS was reunited in 1997 and got momentum in Hokkaido. Impressed by Morisaki's desire to make TEAM NACS a local theatrical unit in Hokkaido that would receive many stage offers from Tokyo, he has been active as a member of TEAM NACS while working as a local talent in Hokkaido.

Joined CREATIVE OFFICE CUE in 2000 with Oto'o by transferring from the office he belonged to at that time. First advance to Tokyo at the TEAM NACS stage performance held in May 2004. In 2005, she made her first appearance in a nationwide online drama series "1 Liter of Tears". Since then, he has been active mainly in Tokyo, such as appearing in serial dramas and movies produced by the Tokyo flagship station.

Mother died of cancer in December 2006. From January 1, 2008, the stage name was changed from the real name "Shigeyuki Sato" to "Shigeyuki Totsugi" after taking the mother's maiden name. The mother's maiden name "Totsugi" is originally read as "Bekki", but it is read as "Totsugi" which is easy to read and remember.

Married to actress Yui Ichikawa on September 8, 2015, after co-starring in the 2014 drama "Owakon TV" (NHK BS Premium). 2016 September 26, the first boy was born. In 2020 September 10, a second boy was born.

Filmography 
Bold is starring.

TV dramas 

 Sikoku R-14 (2001, HTB)
 1 Litre no Namida (2005, CX)
 Suppli (2006,CX)
 Galileo (2007,CX)
 Asadora (NHK)
 Hitomi (2008)
 Natsuzora (2019)
Chimudondon (2022)
 THE QUIZ SHOW (2008/2009, NTV) – Also in charge of the screenplay.
 33 Minutes Detective (2008/2009,CX)
 Uta no Onisan (2009, EX)
 853~Keiji Kamoshinnnosuke (2010, TX)
 Team Batista（2010年, KTV/CX）
 Uchuken Sakusen  (2010,TX)
Kirinisumu Akuma  (2011, THK)
 Soup Corry（2012, HBC/TBS）
Summer Rescue~Tenku no Shinryojyo~ (2012,TBS)
Saibantyoo! Onakasukimashita  (2013–2014,NTV)
LINK  (2013, Wowow)
Kuro Courch (2013,TBS)
Owakon TV (2014,NHK)
Endless Affair〜Owarinaki Jyoji〜  (2014,LaLa TV)
Subete ga F ni Naru (2014,CX)
Hiru no Sento Zake (2016,TX)
Shihei-DEATH CASH- (2016,TBS)
Medical Team Lady da Vinci no Shindan (2016,KTV/CX)
Kirawa reru Yuki  (2017,CX)
 Boku dake ga Inai Machi (2017, Netflix)
 Video Girl Ai (2018,TX)
 Good Doctor (2018,CX)
 Channel wa Sonomama! (2019,HTB)
 Kansatsutei Asagao (2019/2021-2021,CX)
 Ossan's Love (2019,EX)
 Hanzawa Naoki (2020,TBS)
 Good Luck! Team Nacs (2021,Wowow)
 Kamen Rider Revice (2021,TV-Asahi)

Movie 

 man-hole (2001)
 Pakodatejinn (2002)
 river (2003)
 Gin no Engels (2004)
 enma (2007)
 Little DJ〜Chiisana Koi no Monogatari  (2007)
 Dosokai  (2008)
 TEAM NACS FILMS「N43°」 (2009)  – Also in charge of director and screenplay.
 Giniro no Ame (2009)
 Mitsuko Delivers (2011)
 Ouran High School Host Club (2012)
 It's a Beautiful Life – IRODORI (2012)
 Karasu no Oyayubi (2012)
 AIBOU Series X DAY (2013)
 Rakugo Eiga "Sarugoke ha Tsuraiyo" (2013)
 Nekosamurai (2014)
 Team Batista FINAL Keruberosu no Syozo (2014)
 Endless Affair〜Owarinaki Jyoji〜  (2014)
 Goddotan Kisgaman Sensyuken THE MOVIE2 Saikikku Club (2014)
 April Fools (2015)
 Hokori to Genso (2015)
 The Long Excuse (2016)
 Boku no ojisan (2016)
 Shippu Rondo (2016)
 Yo-kai Watch: Soratobu Kujira to Double no Sekai no Daibōken da Nyan! (2016)
 One Week Friends (2017)
 Yurari (2017)
 Ekisutorand (2017)
 Kam ito Hito no Aida（2018）
 After the Rain (2018)
 Kūbo Ibuki (2019)
Good Luck! Team Nacs: Movie Version (2021)

Variety Shows 
 Tennenmono (1997 – 2002,HBC)
How Do You Like Wednesday?（1996 – 2002, HTB）
Dorabara Suzui no Su（2002 – 2004,HTB）
 HanatareNACS（2003 – ,HTB）
Onigiri Atatamemasuka（2003 – ,HTB）
TyoCUE Syobu（2008 – ,Channel NECO）
SONGS (2017 -, NHK) – Narration

Voice acting roles 
 Spirited Away （2001）
 Howl's Moving Castle （2004）
 When Marnie Was There （2014）

TV Anime 
 ChibiNACS（2006 – 2008, STV）

Puppet Show 
 Monkeyperm（2013 – 2015, TVK etc）

Discography 
 Not get up guy（起きないあいつ, Duet song with Yo Oizumi in 2004）

Bibliography 
 ONE (2014)

References

External links 
 Official profile  – CREATIVE OFFICE CUE（in Japanese）
 TEAM NACS Official profile  – Amuse Inc. （in Japanese）
 

1973 births
Living people
Japanese male film actors
Japanese male television actors
Japanese theatre directors
Japanese screenwriters
Male voice actors from Hokkaido
People from Sapporo
21st-century Japanese singers
21st-century Japanese male singers
Amuse Inc. talents